The 2001 Girabola was the 23rd season of top-tier football competition in Angola. The season ran from 17 March to 16 December 2001. Petro de Luanda were the defending champions.

The league comprised 14 teams, the bottom three of which were relegated to the 2002 Gira Angola.

Petro de Luanda were crowned champions, winning their 13th title, while Bravos do Maquis, Primeiro de Maio and Progresso do Sambizanga, were relegated.

Flávio Amado of Petro de Luanda finished as the top scorer with 23 goals.

Changes from the 2000 season
Relegated: ARA da Gabela, Sporting Cabinda and Sporting do Bié 
Promoted: Benfica do Lubango, Primeiro de Maio and Progresso do Sambizanga

League table

Results

Season statistics

Top scorers

Most goals scored in a single match

References

External links
Girabola 2001 standings at girabola.com
Federação Angolana de Futebol

Girabola seasons
Angola
Angola
2001 in Angolan football